
Lac de Morgins is a lake in Valais, Switzerland. It is located at Morgins (municipality of Troistorrents), near the Pas de Morgins, the pass into France.

Morgins